The eleventh and final series of the BBC sitcom My Family began airing on 1 July 2011, and concluded on 2 September 2011. The opening episode, "Labour Pains", re-introduces the six main characters. All episodes from the eleventh series are thirty minutes in length. The series was produced by Rude Boy Productions, a company that produces comedies created by Fred Barron. Unlike previous series of the show, which were filmed on a yearly basis, both Series 10 and 11 were filmed back-to-back. The series has been released on DVD on 15 August 2011, meaning the last three episodes of the series was released before they were broadcast on the television.

Episode Information

References

2011 British television seasons